Strzelce Opolskie railway station is a station in Strzelce Opolskie, Opole Voivodeship, Poland. The building is located by 6 Dworcowa Street.

The modern-day railway station was built in 1935 to meet the then modern-day standards. The railway station was at its height in the Interwar period and during the Polish People's Republic, with trains heading to Fosowskie and Kędzierzyn-Koźle. Formerly, there also existed an industrial spur to the industrial complex of Agromet-Pionier and Zakłady Wapiennicze. In the 1990s, when the Polskie Koleje Państwowe were hit by a general financial crisis, the railway station fell into ruins. The waiting room, baggage hold and public washrooms were closed due to the deteriorating state of the building. In 2000, the direct routes to Fosowskie and Kędzierzyn-Koźle were terminated.

Between 2013 and 2014, together with the modernisation of the Błotnica Strzelecka - Opole Groszowice railway line, the railway station platforms and tunnel were renovated. As a result, the railway station was revivied, with increasing Tanie Linie Kolejowe and PKP Intercity connections.

Connections 

132 Bytom - Wrocław Główny
175 Zimna Wódka - Rozmierka.

Train services
The station is served by the following service(s):

Intercity services (TLK) Warszawa - Częstochowa - Katowice - Opole - Wrocław - Szklarska Poręba Górna
Regional services (R) Opole Główne - Gliwice

References 

Strzelce County
Railway stations in Opole Voivodeship
Railway stations in Poland opened in 1878